Kipushi Airport  is an airport serving the village of Kipushi in Lomami Province, Democratic Republic of the Congo.

See also

Transport in the Democratic Republic of the Congo
List of airports in the Democratic Republic of the Congo

References

External links
 OurAirports - Kipushi Airport
 FallingRain - Kipushi Airport
 HERE Maps - Kipushi Airport
 

Airports in Lomami